This is a list of universities in Madagascar.

Universities 
Arsenal Higher Polytechnic Institute   
Catholic University of Madagascar  
Higher Institute of Communication, Business, and Management of Madagascar
Higher Institute of Technology of Antananarivo   
Higher Institute of Theology and Philosophy of Madagascar   
Higher Polytechnic Institute of Madagascar   
Higher Vocational Agricultural School of Bevalala   
Madagascar Institute of Political Studies   
National Institute of Public Health   
Reformed University of Madagascar   
University of Antananarivo   
University of Antsiranana or University of North Madagascar 
University of Fianarantsoa   
University of Mahajanga   
University of Toamasina
University of Toliara
Zurcher Adventist University

Seminaries 
 Major Seminary of Antananarivo

Former universities 
 University of Madagascar

References

Madagascar
Universities
Madagascar